Motiv8, a pun on the word "motivate", may refer to:

 "Motiv8" (song), a 2018 song by J. Cole
 Motiv 8 (producer), alias of Steve Rodway, English dance music producer
 DJ Motiv8, American turntablist for 1990s hip hop group Atban Klann
 Motiv8 Technologies, an American company founded by Eugene Lee

See also
 Motivate (disambiguation)